The 1953–54 season was the 55th season of competitive league football in the history of English football club Wolverhampton Wanderers. They played in the First Division, then the highest level of English football.

The season was a major success as the team won the League championship for the first time in their history, pipping local rivals West Bromwich Albion. Winning the title was a breakthrough for the club after three times previously finishing runners-up.

Season review
After an opening day mauling away at Burnley, the team found its feet and enjoyed a run of five successive wins to reach second place. The table was led by their Black Country rivals West Bromwich Albion. Both teams kept up a relentless pace before Christmas, with Wolves producing a run that brought 31 points out of a possible 36, including defeating West Brom 1–0. At the halfway mark only Burnley and newly promoted Huddersfield Town were managing to keep pace with the top two.

Defeat in their Christmas fixture against Aston Villa lost Wolves the top spot they had gained for the first time a week earlier. The start of 1954 brought an instant exit from the FA Cup at the hands of fellow Midlanders Birmingham City, but also saw them return to the top of the table. A run of three defeats in four though – including the end of their 11-game unbeaten away record (a club record) – allowed West Brom to regain top spot.

While March saw Wolves suffer further defeats, their main rival's form proved even worse. A second Black Country derby victory for Wolves against them in early April brought them level on points at the summit, second only on goal average with only five games remaining. Wolves then claimed top spot for the first time since early January the following week after thrashing Charlton 5–0.

The Easter period proved the pivotal twist in the title race. A 4–0 thumping of Huddersfield gave Wolves' goal average a further boost, while West Brom were held to a draw by Aston Villa. As was then traditional, the fixtures were reversed the following day, with decisive results. Although both title chasers lost, West Brom's 1–6 hammering at Villa Park left their goal average far short of Wolves' with just a single game to play.

Only a huge loss for Wolves coupled with a big win for Albion could alter the outcome of the championship on the final day. In the event, neither happened, Albion went down to defeat at Portsmouth, while Wolves' 2–0 victory over Tottenham confirmed their first ever league championship.

Results

Football League First Division

A total of 22 teams competed in the First Division in the 1953–54 season. Each team would play every other team twice, once at their stadium, and once at the opposition's. Two points were awarded to teams for each win, one point per draw, and none for defeats.

Final table

Results by round

FA Cup

As a First Division team, Wolves entered the competition at the third round stage. The draw for this round was made on 14 December 1953.

Players

Top scorer

Most appearances

Transfers

In

Out

1953-54
Wolverhampton Wanderers F.C.
1954